The 2001 San Francisco 49ers season was the franchise's 56th season and 52nd in the National Football League. The 49ers rebounded from two losing seasons in 1999 and 2000, achieving their first winning season under quarterback Jeff Garcia and returning to the playoffs behind a strong 12–4 record. However, the 49ers failed to progress further, falling 25–15 to the Green Bay Packers in the wild-card round. This was the fourth time out of five games that they had lost to the Packers in the playoffs since the 1995 season. However, they have won all four meetings since then.

The 49ers' twelve regular-season wins were the most ever for a #5 seed under the 1990 playoff expansion format. Their three overtime wins tied the NFL record at the time, which has since been surpassed by the 2011 Arizona Cardinals and 2021 Las Vegas Raiders.

Offseason

NFL draft

Staff

Roster

Regular season

Schedule

Game Summaries 
 Week One vs. Atlanta Falcons – Despite limiting the Falcons to 241 total yards the Niners had to rally from down 13–3 in the second half. J.J. Stokes caught a touchdown from Jeff Garcia early in the fourth and Jose Cortez' 20-yard field goal forced overtime, where he won it from 24 yards out. Rookie Michael Vick of the Falcons attempted four passes, none completed.

 Week Two vs. St. Louis Rams – The Rams raced to a 12–0 lead (marred by a botched two-point conversion attempt) before giving up 16 unanswered points to the Niners (marred by a missed PAT) to end the first half. The Rams behind Kurt Warner then outscored Jeff Garcia's Niners 18–10 in the second half, winning by a 30–26 final as they held the Niners to 232 yards of offense.

 Week Three at NY Jets – Three years after Garrison Hearst's 96-yard overtime touchdown, the 49ers faced the New York Jets again, this time grinding out a 19–17 win. Hearst had 83 yards as the Niners rushed for 233 yards vs. 82 for the Jets, 76 of them (and a touchdown) from Curtis Martin.

 Week Four vs. Carolina Panthers – The Panthers had won four straight against the 49ers and eight of the two clubs' first thirteen meetings, but with rookie washout Chris Weinke the Panthers fell 24–14; the Niners picked off Weinke three times while Jeff Garcia had 212 passing yards and two touchdowns to Terrell Owens; five Niners backs also rushed for 150 yards.

 Week Five at Atlanta Falcons – After being held without a catch for the entire first half Terrell Owens erupted to nine catches for 183 yards and three touchdowns, the last a 52-yard bomb in overtime, as the Niners battled from behind the entire game. Chris Chandler of the Falcons had two touchdowns, the last a 47-yarder to Brian Finneran with 2:22 to go in the fourth. 

 Week six – BYE WEEK

 Week Seven at Chicago Bears – The Niners had beaten the Bears five straight meetings entering this encounter, but this game proved difficult for San Francisco after the Niners raced to a 28–9 lead in the third quarter. The Bears exploded to three touchdowns, two of them David Terrell catches from Shane Matthews that forced overtime tied 31-31. Six seconds into overtime Jeff Garcia's pass to Terrell Owens bounced out of his hands and was intercepted by Mike Brown, who ran back a 33-yard touchdown; it was the first of a series of consecutive overtime scores by Brown as the Bears won 37–31.

 Week Eight vs. Detroit Lions – With Ed Hochuli as head referee, the Niners welcomed their former linebacker Matt Millen, now the ill-fated front office executive of the Lions, by beating his present team 21–13. Robert Bailey picked off Jeff Garcia and ran back a 74-yard touchdown, but after taking a 10–0 lead the Lions were crushed by three Garcia touchdowns, including two more to Terrell Owens, as three Detroit passers failed to surpass 90 total yards.

 Week Nine vs. New Orleans Saints – The Niners hosted the Saints for what proved to be the final time as NFC West division foes and edged the defending division champs 28–27. Two touchdowns to Terrell Owens put the Niners up but late in the third Joe Horn's catch from Aaron Brooks put the Saints ahead 24–21. Jeff Garcia found Eric Johnson early in the fourth and the Saints could get no closer than 28–27 in the fourth.

 Week Ten @ Carolina Panthers – The Niners had to put up 417 yards of offense to erase a 22-14 Panthers lead and win 25–22. The Niners needed the final play of regulation to tie the game on a seven-yard Terrell Owens catch and Eric Johnson catch for the two-point conversion. In overtime the Niners needed eight plays before Jose Cortez finished the game off from 26 yards out.

 Week Eleven at Indianapolis Colts – Despite trailing 21-20 and being outgained 340 yards of offense to 491 for the Colts, the 49ers crushed Indianapolis 40-21 by picking off Peyton Manning four times; Zack Bronson ran back one pick for a 48-yard touchdown. The Colts thus had lost for the third straight time and the frustration spilled into an infamous post-game press conference meltdown by Colts coach Jim E. Mora.

 Week Twelve vs. Buffalo Bills – For the second time in the season Ed Hochuli was the head referee in a 49ers game at The Stick and the Niners made it an easy game for Hochuli by crushing the Bills 35–0. Hochuli flagged the Bills for seven penalties versus just one for the 49ers, who put up 409 yards of offense vs. 191 for Buffalo. Garrison Hearst rushed for 124 yards.

 Week Thirteen at St. Louis Rams – In defeating the 49ers 27-14 Kurt Warner ended the Niners' quest for the division title with 294 yards and two touchdowns, outclassing Jeff Garcia's 146 yards with 26 incompletions; Ricky Proehl's 109 receiving yards nearly outgained the pass-catching yardage of the entire Niners receiving corps.

 Week Fourteen vs. Miami Dolphins – The Dolphins put up 174 yards of offense while the Niners had 152 yards rushing en route to a 21–0 shutout win. Jay Fiedler was intercepted three times while Jeff Garcia had a touchdown to Eric Johnson.

 Week Fifteen vs. Philadelphia Eagles – The Niners played their last home game of the year by edging the Eagles 13–3. The two teams combined for just 536 yards of offense (with 109 yards of penalties to the Eagles) as Terrell Owens had the game's only touchdown, a 32-yard catch.
 |Weather=  (Partly Cloudy)

 Week Sixteen @ Dallas Cowboys – A year after the infamous confrontation between Terrell Owens and the Cowboys at Texas Stadium's 50-yard line, the Cowboys won 27-21 behind three total touchdowns, 241 passing yards, and 30 rushing yards from Quincy Carter. Emmitt Smith exploded to 126 rushing yards.

 Week Seventeen @ New Orleans Saints – The 49ers crushed the Saints 38-0 as they intercepted Aaron Brooks four times, forced two fumbles, and Jeff Garcia threw four touchdowns, two of them 50-plus yarders to Terrell Owens. The Saints were held to 126 total yards of offense in their final game as an NFC West team.

Standings

Playoffs

NFC Wild Card at Green Bay Packers 

Scoring
GB – Freeman 5 pass from Favre (kick blocked) GB 6–0
SF – Hearst 2 run (Cortez kick) SF 7–6
GB – field goal Longwell 26 GB 9–7
GB – Franks 19 pass from Favre (Two-point conversion failed) GB 15–7
SF – Streets 19 pass from Garcia (Streets pass from Garcia) Tie 15–15
GB – field goal Longwell 45 GB 18–15
GB – Green 9 run (Longwell kick) GB 25–15

Awards
 Garrison Hearst won NFL Comeback Player of the Year Award

References 
Notes

Bibliography
 49ers on Pro Football Reference
 49ers Schedule on jt-sw.com

San Francisco 49ers
San Francisco 49ers seasons
2001 in sports in California
2001 in San Francisco